Patricia Bourcier (born August 15, 1979) is a Canadian retired soccer player who played as a defender. She made one international appearance for the Canadian national team.

College career 
Bourcier attended Laval University, where she studied physical education, and played as a defender for the Rouge et Or from 1999 to 2004. 

As a rookie, she received FSSQ First Team All-Star honours. In 2000 and 2001, she was named to the CIS All-Canadian First Team and to the FSSQ First Team All-Star. In her fourth season with the team, she was named to the CIS All-Canadian Second Team as well as the CIS Tournament All-Star Team. She also received FSSQ First Team All-Star honours for the fourth straight year, and FSSQ Athlete of the week honours in November. She missed the 2003 season due to a knee injury, but returned for the 2004 season.

Club career 
In 2001, Bourcier joined the Laval Dynamites in the USL W-League.
In 2003, she played for the Ottawa Fury, where she made 12 appearances, recording one assist. The following year, she signed with the Montreal Xtreme, but only made two appearances for the club.

In 2005, after finishing university, Bourcier joined the Dynamo de Quebec in the LSEQ. She was a member of the side that won the Jubilee Trophy in 2007. That year, she was also nominated for the LSEQ Best Player (Meilleure Joueuse) award. She later joined Chaudière-Ouest, where she played AAA soccer for almost twelve years, until 2018. In September 2018, she was appointed as an ambassador for the club.

International career 
In January 2002, Bourcier was invited to attend the Canadian national team training camp in Ottawa. The following month, she joined the team for the 2002 Algarve Cup. On March 1, at the age of 22, she made her first and only international appearance in a 3–0 win over Scotland at the Estádio Municipal de Quarteira.

Bourcier also represented Canada at the 2001 Summer Universiade in China, the 2003 Summer Universiade in South Korea, and the 2005 Summer Universiade in Turkey.

Career statistics

International

Honours

Club 
Dynamo de Quebec
Jubilee Trophy: 2007

Individual 
CIS All-Canadian First Team: 2000, 2001
CIS All-Canadian Second Team: 2002
CIS Tournament All-Star Team: 2002
FSSQ First Team All-Star: 1999, 2000, 2001, 2002

References

External links 

1979 births
Living people
People from Lévis, Quebec
Canada women's international soccer players
Canadian women's soccer players
French Quebecers
Laval Rouge et Or athletes
Soccer people from Quebec
Université Laval alumni
Women's association football defenders
Ottawa Fury (women) players
USL W-League (1995–2015) players
Dynamo de Quebec players